Antonio Ríos Martínez (born 24 October 1988) is a Mexican professional footballer who plays as a defensive midfielder.

Clausura 2009 Debut
Antonio Rios made his debut with Toluca against Atlante which was the first game of the season for Toluca FC. He only played 2 games the entire season; both games he played, he was used as a substitute. Toluca was 2nd place in the season of the Mexican League. Toluca lost in the quarter-finals to Indios, losing the first game 1-0 and tying the second leg 0-0(1-0) 
global.

Career statistics

International career

Honours
Toluca
Mexican Primera División: Apertura 2008, Bicentenario 2010

Mexico
CONCACAF Gold Cup: 2015

Individual
Best Rookie of the tournament: Bicentenario 2010

References

External links
 
 
 

1988 births
Living people
Liga MX players
Deportivo Toluca F.C. players
Footballers from Guerrero
Atlético Mexiquense footballers
Mexico international footballers
2015 CONCACAF Gold Cup players
CONCACAF Gold Cup-winning players
Mexican footballers
Association football midfielders